Strakhovsky is a rural locality (a khutor) in Novokiyevskoye Rural Settlement, Novoanninsky District, Volgograd Oblast, Russia. The population was 31 as of 2010. There are 3 streets.

Geography 
Strakhovsky is located on the Khopyorsko-Buzulukskaya Plain, on the left bank of the Karman River, 46 km southeast of Novoanninsky (the district's administrative centre) by road. Burnatsky is the nearest rural locality.

References 

Rural localities in Novoanninsky District